The fifth season of Hawaii Five-O premiered on September 12, 1972, and ended March 13, 1973. 24 episodes aired during this season. The Region 1 DVD was released on November 18, 2008.

Episodes 

1972 American television seasons
1973 American television seasons
05